Klimentiy Gavrilov (born 9 August 2002) is a Belarusian professional footballer who plays for Huragan Międzyrzec Podlaski.

References

External links 
 
 

2002 births
Living people
Belarusian footballers
Association football midfielders
Belarusian expatriate footballers
Expatriate footballers in Slovakia
Expatriate footballers in Poland
FC Isloch Minsk Raion players
FC Energetik-BGU Minsk players
FC Slonim-2017 players